Hans K. Schuler (May 25, 1874 – March 30, 1951) was a German-born American sculptor and monument maker. He was the first American sculptor ever to win the Salon Gold Medal. His works are in several important museum collections, and he also created many public monuments, mostly for locations in Baltimore, Maryland and in the Washington, D.C. area. For over a quarter of a century he served as president of the Maryland Institute College of Art.

Life and work

Hans Schuler was born in a part of Alsace-Lorraine which was then under German sovereignty, though it is now part of France. Schuler's family emigrated to the United States while he was still a youngster.  He graduated from the Maryland Institute College of Art (MICA) in Baltimore, Maryland, having studied there at the Rinehart School of Sculpture.

He continued his artistic training in France at the Académie Julian, studying under Raoul Verlet. Schuler won the Salon Gold Medal in Paris in 1901, the first American sculptor ever to do so. Returning to Baltimore, he built his studio at 7 East Lafayette Avenue in 1906  , residing and working in Baltimore for the rest of his life. Schuler served as president of MICA from 1925 to 1951 and was a member of the Charcoal Club of Baltimore. His works are in the collections of museums including the National Gallery of Art in Washington, DC and the Walters Art Museum in Baltimore. His Baltimore studio is still in use as the Schuler School of Fine Arts, founded in 1959 by sculptor Hans C. Schuler (1912–1999), the son of Hans K. Schuler. The Hans Schuler Studio and Residence was added to the National Register of Historic Places in 1985.

Schuler's sculptures and monuments grace many public places. Among them is a statue of U.S. President James Buchanan in Meridian Hill Park in Washington, D.C. It is the only public memorial dedicated to Buchanan. On Baltimore's Charles Street, in the area of the main campus of Johns Hopkins University, there are also imposing monuments by Schuler honoring Johns Hopkins and Sidney Lanier. All three of these monuments are large bronzes occupying elaborate stone placements. Schuler's sculptures and reliefs also adorn the interiors of many public buildings. For example, Schuler, along with sculptor J. Maxwell Miller, created a large relief panel which is located in the main concert hall at the Peabody Conservatory in Baltimore.

While Hans Schuler created many public monuments, he also created extremely sensual examples of free sculpture, including a life-sized and very lifelike marble nude – now at the Walters Art Museum – representing the abandoned Ariadne, writhing in sadness and longing. Below is a link to an image and auction record of another Schuler piece of this type, recently sold at Christie's in London.

Other works by Schuler can be found at St. Mary's College of Maryland, Arlington National Cemetery, National Portrait Gallery, Fogg Art Museum, Peabody Institute, Johns Hopkins University, Maryland Historical Society, University of Virginia, St. John's College (Annapolis, Maryland), Louisiana State University, State University of New York, (Albany and Bronx), Lutheran Theological Seminary at Gettysburg, PA and in various parks in the Baltimore and Washington D.C. area. He is buried in Loudon Park National Cemetery.

Schuler was a member of the National Sculpture Society and exhibited in their 1923 exhibition.

Schuler also taught at the Corcoran School of Art, where his pupils included Mary Blackford Fowler.

Baltimore monuments
Schuler was known as "Baltimore's Monument Maker" after creating many of the city's monuments on streets and parks. Some of these include:

Martin Luther Monument, originally located at Druid Hill Park; now at Lake Montebello
Casimir Pulaski Monument, Patterson Park
Johns Hopkins Monument, Johns Hopkins University
Sidney Lanier Memorial, Johns Hopkins University
Samuel Smith Monument, Federal Hill Park
Francis Scott Key Marker, Mount Vernon
Fallsway Fountain, Mount Vernon
To the Glory of Maryland, Maryland National Guard

Cemetery monuments

Like many of the successful sculptors of his day, Schuler created quite a few cemetery memorials.  Many of these sculptures are life-sized or even larger than life-sized bronze human figures. Often the figures sit or sprawl across the tombstones in an attitude of grief, nostalgia, pensiveness, or anguish, like fellow mourners at the grave, or ghosts sociably mingling with the living, instead of being perched neatly on pedestals. The Riggs memorial, shown at right, is a good example. The Lanier monument pictured above, while not being a cemetery sculpture, also exemplifies Schuler's knack for presenting figures in this way. Most of the cemetery pieces are located in and around Baltimore. They include:

Key Memorial, Cathedral Cemetery
Hinrich Memorial, Druid Ridge Cemetery
Gail Memorial, Druid Ridge Cemetery
Schmidt Memorial, Druid Ridge Cemetery
Wagner-Lawyer Memorial, Druid Ridge Cemetery
Coates Memorial, Druid Ridge Cemetery
Baetjer Memorial, Greenmount Cemetery
Hilken Memorial, Greenmount Cemetery
Maulsby Memorial, Greenmount Cemetery
Riggs Memorial, Greenmount Cemetery
Mendels Memorial, Hebrew Cemetery
Oppenheim Memorial, Hebrew Cemetery
Krug Memorial, Loudon Park Cemetery
Husted Memorial, Loudon Park Cemetery
Nitze Memorial, Loudon Park Cemetery
Kaiser Memorial, Loudon Park Cemetery
Newcomes Memorial, Woodlawn Cemetery
Winslow Memorial, Lakeside Cemetery Brockport, NY
Fisher Memorial, Ashland Cemetery, Ashland KY

Coins
Schuler designed the 1934 United States commemorative Maryland Tercentenary half dollar.

See also
Maryland Institute College of Art
Hans Schuler Studio and Residence

References

Davenport, R. J.; Davenport's art reference & price guide, Davenport's Art Reference; Ventura, Calif.; biennial (every 2 years) ; 
Falk, Peter H.; Who was who in American art (Madison, Conn. : Sound View Press, 1985) 
Keyser, Ephraim, Baltimore The Monument City – Why? Art and Archaeology May, June 1925
Kvaran, Einar Einarsson, Cemetery Sculpture of America, unpublished manuscript
National Sculpture Society, Exhibition of American Sculpture Catalogue, 1923, National Sculpture Society, New York 1923
Opitz, Glenn B., ed., "Dictionary of American Sculptors" (Poughkeepsie, NY: Apollo, 1984) 
Rusk, William Sener, Art in Baltimore: Monuments and Memorials, The Norman Remington Company, Baltimore, 1924.

External links

Marylandartsource summary information on Hans K. Schuler
Schuler School of Fine Arts  website
Askart.com page on Hans Schuler
Auction record with COLOR IMAGE of Schuler work sold at Christie's, London, in September 2006

Baltimore City Paper article on Schuler (Tom Chalkley, January 2001)
Art Inventories Catalog of the Smithsonian American Art Museum: detailed information on the Lanier monument, including the following description: "Sidney Lanier is shown seated on huge unpolished granite boulders, leaning back slightly on his proper right arm, his proper left leg crossed over his proper right leg. In his proper left hand he holds an open book and in his proper right he holds a pencil. His flute is by his proper right leg. He is dressed in a suit with a vest and overcoat, his full beard spreads over the opening of his vest as he tilts his head slightly downward toward his book. He leans back against a boulder which is carved with a relief depicting a landscape and two allegorical female figures. They hold hands, one also holding an unrolled scroll, and the other one also holding a musical instrument."
Newsletter of the German Society of Maryland: noting the 2006 centennial celebration of the opening of Schuler's Baltimore studio on Lafayette Street. The studio is now the Schuler School of Fine Arts.
Artfact.com bio

1874 births
1951 deaths
Cemetery art
Maryland Institute College of Art faculty
Académie Julian alumni
People from Alsace-Lorraine
Artists from Baltimore
20th-century American sculptors
20th-century American male artists
American male sculptors
National Sculpture Society members
Sculptors from Maryland
American currency designers
Coin designers
Emigrants from the German Empire to the United States